Denysenko is a Ukrainian surname, derived from the given name Dennis. Notable people with this surname include:

 Filaret (Denysenko) (born 1929), Ukrainian Orthodox primate
 Iaroslav Denysenko (born 1991), Ukrainian Paralympic swimmer
 Kateryna Denysenko (born 1994), Ukrainia Paralympic swimmer
 Larysa Denysenko (born 1973), Ukrainian writer and lawyer
 Leonid Denysenko (born 1926), Ukrainian-Australian artist
 Petro Denysenko (1920–1998), Ukrainian athlete

See also
 

Ukrainian-language surnames
Patronymic surnames
Surnames from given names